The grey-breasted parakeet (Pyrrhura griseipectus) is an Endangered species of bird in subfamily Arinae of the family Psittacidae, the African and New World parrots. It is endemic to Ceará in northeastern Brazil.

Taxonomy and systematics

Until the early 2000s the grey-breasted parakeet was considered a subspecies of the white-eared parakeet (P. leucotis), which is also called maroon-faced parakeet. There is some thought that the specific epithet griseipectus should be replaced by anaca, which was originally applied to another parakeet, but which appears to have priority.

Description

The sexes are the same. Adults have a brown crown, a plum-red face, and white ear coverts. Their upperparts are mostly green with a red-brown rump. Their chin, throat, and the sides of their neck are grayish with a scaly appearance. The center of their belly is red-brown and the rest of their underparts are green. Their wing is mostly green with a red shoulder and bluish flight feathers. Their tail is red-brown. Immatures are similar to adults.

Distribution and habitat

The grey-breasted parakeet is found in only three sites, all in the Brazilian state of Ceará, though it formerly was known from as many as 15 locations. As of 2020, populations are known in Serra do Baturité, Quixadá, and Ibaretama. It inhabits patches of tall humid forest within otherwise dry caatinga and in granite- or sandstone-dominated areas. It is almost always found above  of elevation.

Behavior

Movement

The grey-breasted parakeet is not known to have any pattern of movement.

Feeding

The grey-breasted parakeet forages for fruits and seeds in the forest canopy.

Breeding

The grey-breated parakeet's breeding season is not fully known but does include February and March. It nests in cavities in trees and in rocks, and also uses nest boxes erected by conservation projects. The clutch size can be as high as seven eggs. The incubation period, time to fledging, and details of parental care are not known.

Vocalization

The grey-breasted parakeet's call is a "piercing, fast, chattering 't'kreet-kreet-wik-kreet-krit'."

Status

The IUCN originally assessed the grey-breasted parakeet as Critically Endangered but in 2017 revised the status to Endangered. It occupies very small enclaves and has an estimated population of between about 400 and 600 mature individuals. As a result of intensive conservation efforts including the provision of nest boxes the population is believed to be increasing at all three known locations. Most of what had been its forest habitat has been converted to agriculture, especially coffee farming. An ongoing threat is illegal trapping for the pet trade, both domestic and international, though the rate of it has apparently lessened since the early 2000s. The lack of natural nest cavities has somewhat been offset by the provision of nest boxes.

References

Further reading
 Ribas, C. C., L. Joseph, C. Y. Miyaki (2006). Molecular systematics and patterns of diversification in Pyrrhura (Psittacidae), with special reference to the picta-leucotis complex. The Auk 123(3): 660–680.

grey-breasted parakeet
Birds of the Caatinga
Endemic birds of Brazil
Parrots of South America
grey-breasted parakeet